This is the discography of British singer-songwriter and musician Thomas Dolby.

Albums

Studio albums

Live albums

Soundtrack albums

Compilation albums

Video albums

EPs

Singles

Contributions

Notes

References

Discographies of British artists
Pop music discographies
Rock music discographies
New wave discographies